Supervision Broadcasting Network , or SBN, is a television channel in Mongolia. It is a subsidiary of Supervision LLC which is owned by Boldkhet Sereeter.

It was established in 2006.

See also
Media of Mongolia
Communications in Mongolia

References

External links
Channel information at MyTV.mn 

Television companies of Mongolia